The North Drain flows westerly from Hurn Sluice on the River Sheppey to the North Drain Pumping Station at the River Brue, in Somerset, England.

References 

Rivers of Somerset
Somerset Levels